Winnifred "Winnie" Sorgdrager (born 6 April 1948) is a retired Dutch politician of the Democrats 66 (D66) party and jurist. She was granted the honorary title of Minister of State on 22 June 2018.

Biography
Sorgdrager studied law at the University of Groningen.  Sorgdrager worked as researcher at the University of Twente from July 1971 until January 1979. Sorgdrager worked as a prosecutor for the Prosecution Service in Almelo from January 1979 until May 1986 and as solicitor general for the Prosecution Service in Arnhem from May 1986 until January 1991. Sorgdrager worked as Attorney General of the Courts of Appeal of Arnhem from January 1991 until January 1994 and as Attorney General of the Courts of Appeal of The Hague from January 1994 until 22 August 1994.

After the election of 1994, Sorgdrager was appointed Minister of Justice in the Cabinet Kok I, taking office on 22 August 1994. In April 1998, Sorgdrager announced that she would not stand for the election of 1998. Following the cabinet formation of 1998, Sorgdrager was not given a cabinet post in the new cabinet, The Cabinet Kok I was replaced by the Cabinet Kok II on 3 August 1998. In September 1998, Sorgdrager was a candidate as the next National Ombudsman, but had to retract her candidacy following criticism from the Prosecution Service. Sorgdrager was elected as a Member of the Senate after the Senate election of 1999, serving from 8 June 1999 until her resignation on 1 October 1999. In December 2005, Sorgdrager was nominated as a Member of the Council of State, serving from 1 January 2006 until 1 May 2018.

Sorgdrager is also a member of the Supervisory Board of the Leiden University Medical Center, a commissioner for the association for the preservation of historic houses of The Netherlands, Vereniging Hendrick de Keyser, and a member of the board of the Arbo Unie. 

Sorgdrager has two sons, Ernest and Daniel, from her past marriage to Jan Willem Loot.  Their marriage ended in divorce in 1977.

Decorations

References

External links

Official
  Mr. W. (Winnie) Sorgdrager Parlement & Politiek
  Mr. W. Sorgdrager (D66) Eerste Kamer der Staten-Generaal

 
 

1948 births
Living people
Commanders of the Order of the Netherlands Lion
Dutch academic administrators
20th-century Dutch judges
Lawyers from The Hague
Dutch nonprofit directors
Dutch nonprofit executives
Dutch prosecutors
Dutch women jurists
Democrats 66 politicians
Female justice ministers
Leiden University alumni
Members of the Council of State (Netherlands)
Members of the Senate (Netherlands)
Ministers of Justice of the Netherlands
Ministers of State (Netherlands)
Officers of the Order of Orange-Nassau
Politicians from The Hague
University of Groningen alumni
Academic staff of the University of Twente
Women government ministers of the Netherlands
Women judges
20th-century Dutch civil servants
20th-century Dutch women politicians
20th-century Dutch politicians
20th-century Dutch women writers
21st-century Dutch civil servants
21st-century Dutch women politicians
21st-century Dutch politicians
21st-century Dutch women writers